This article contains a list of named passenger trains in Canada.

References

 
Canada
Canada railway-related lists